Douglas William John Reid (1934 - 2000)  was Dean of  Glasgow and Galloway from 1987 to 1997.

He was born on 15 February 1934, educated at  Edinburgh Theological College;and ordained deacon in 1963,  and priest in 1964. After a curacy in Ayr he was the Rector of St James, Glasgow from 1968 until 1973; and then of St Ninian, Glasgow from 1973 to 1999.

He  died on 18 March 2000.

References

Alumni of Edinburgh Theological College
Scottish Episcopalian priests
Deans of Glasgow and Galloway
1934 births
2000 deaths